Mahmudabad-e Olya (also Romanized as Maḩmūdābād-e ‘Olyā; also known as Maḩmūdābād-e Bālā) is a village in Sarrud-e Shomali Rural District, in the Central District of Boyer-Ahmad County, Kohgiluyeh and Boyer-Ahmad Province, Iran. At the 2006 census, its population was 338, in 59 families.

References 

Populated places in Boyer-Ahmad County